A turkey shoot is an opportunity for an individual or a party to take advantage of a situation with a significant degree of ease.

The term likely originates from a method of hunting wild turkeys in which the hunter, coming upon a flock, intentionally scatters them.  Once the flock is scattered, the hunter sets up and waits, as the scattered flock will return to that point individually, making them easy targets.

Sport usage 
Besides a literal turkey hunt, the term "turkey shoot" may also refer to a shooting contest in which frozen turkeys are awarded as prizes. The shoot is most commonly held using shotguns aimed at paper targets about 25–35 yards away. Original turkey shoots, however, date at least to the time of James Fenimore Cooper and were contests in which live turkeys were tied down in a pen and shot from 25–35 yards. If the turkey died, the shooter received it as a prize. That gave rise to the military term (see below). Today, turkey shoots are still popular in the rural United States. The winner is chosen according to which target has a shot closest to its center crossmark. Due to the random nature of the exact pattern of pellets that a shotgun shoots, that removes almost all skill from the contest and allows every shooter an equal chance.

Another contest, depicted in the 1941 Gary Cooper film Sergeant York, provided a caged turkey with a protective wall. Above the cage was a slot in which the turkey could raise its head. Single-shot rifles were used, and if the shooter was skilled and fast enough, the turkey was shot in the head, rewarding it to the shooter as his prize.

Military usage 
In military situations, a turkey shoot occurs when a group or team catch the enemy off-guard or outgunned to the point of the battle being extremely lopsided, as in the following famous examples:
 Battle of New Orleans – War of 1812
 Battle of San Jacinto – Texas Revolution
 Charge of the Light Brigade – Crimean War
 Battle of the Crater – American Civil War
 Battle of the Philippine Sea – World War II
 Battle of Longewala – Indo-Pakistani War of 1971
 Operation Mole Cricket 19 – 1982 Lebanon War
 Highway of Death – Gulf War
 Battle of Fallujah (2016) – Iraqi Civil War (2014–2017)

See also 
 Meat shoot
 Fish in a barrel

References 

English phrases
Shooting sports